Maggie Siff (born June 21, 1974) is an American actress. Her most notable television roles have included department store heiress Rachel Menken Katz on the AMC drama Mad Men, Dr. Tara Knowles on the FX drama Sons of Anarchy for which she was twice nominated for the Critics' Choice Television Award for Best Supporting Actress in a Drama Series, and psychiatrist Wendy Rhoades on the Showtime series Billions.

She has also had roles in the films Push (2009) as Teresa Stowe, and Leaves of Grass (2010) as Rabbi Renannah Zimmerman. She starred in indie film A Woman, a Part (2016) and had a minor role in the drama film One Percent More Humid (2017). She is the television spokesperson for the robo-advisor service Betterment.

Early life and education
Siff is an alumna of The Bronx High School of Science and of Bryn Mawr College, where she majored in English and graduated in 1996. She later completed an M.F.A. in acting at New York University's Tisch School of the Arts. Shortly after graduating, Siff also worked as a temp at a hedge fund, an experience she drew on for her role in Billions.

Siff worked extensively in regional theater before acting in television. She won a Barrymore Award for Excellence in Theater in 1998 for her work in Henrik Ibsen's Ghosts at Lantern Theater Company.

Born to a father of Ashkenazi Jewish descent who was also a stage actor, Siff has stated that she feels “culturally Jewish because of how and where I grew up."

Career
Siff started appearing in television series in 2004. She appeared as an Alcoholics Anonymous speaker during an episode of Rescue Me in Season 2. She also had roles on Law & Order: Special Victims Unit, Grey's Anatomy, and Law & Order.

She played Rachel Menken Katz on the series Mad Men from 2007 to 2008, which earned her a nomination, along with the rest of the cast, for a Screen Actors Guild Award for Outstanding Performance by an Ensemble in a Drama Series. She also appeared in a small role as a burn victim on Nip/Tuck during that time, before being cast as Dr. Tara Knowles on Sons of Anarchy in 2008.

She has appeared in such films as Then She Found Me (2007) as Lily, Push as a psychic surgeon (called a Stitch) named Teresa Stowe, sent to help Nick (played by Chris Evans), Funny People (2009) as Rachel, Leaves of Grass (2010) as Rabbi Renannah Zimmerman, and Concussion (2013) as Sam Bennet. She appears in the 2016 Showtime series Billions. She starred in an independent indie film called A Woman, A Part (2016) as well as One Percent More Humid (2017).

In 2017, she narrated the audio book Gwendy's Button Box by Stephen King and Richard Chizmar.

Starting in 2018, she has been serving as the television spokesperson for Betterment, an online investment service.

In 2020, Siff provided the voice for the titular subject of "Polly Platt: The Invisible Woman", over the course of a season of Karina Longworth’s film history podcast You Must Remember This.

Personal life
In October 2013, Siff announced that she was expecting her first child with husband, Paul Ratliff, whom she married in 2012. Siff gave birth to a daughter, Lucy.

Filmography

Film

Television

References

External links
 
 

20th-century American actresses
21st-century American actresses
Actresses from New York City
American film actresses
American television actresses
The Bronx High School of Science alumni
Bryn Mawr College alumni
Jewish American actresses
Living people
Entertainers from the Bronx
Tisch School of the Arts alumni
American Ashkenazi Jews
1974 births